Tetracha insignis is a species of tiger beetle that was described by Chaudoir in 1850, and can be found in only two Brazilian cities: Alagoas and Bahia.

References

Cicindelidae
Beetles described in 1850
Endemic fauna of Brazil
Beetles of South America